Riedy is a surname. Notable people with the surname include:

Bob Riedy (born 1945), American basketball player
Matt Riedy, American actor

See also
Ried
Reidy